Key Witness is a black-and-white 1960 American neo-noir film crime film directed by Phil Karlson and starring Jeffrey Hunter, Pat Crowley, and Dennis Hopper.

Plot
Fred Morrow, an average Los Angeles citizen, witnesses a gang murder when he stops in a café to use a telephone. Aware that he is the only witness against them, the gang members, led by young "Cowboy" Tomkins, seek out his identity and terrorize his family and him to keep him from testifying against them.

A police detective, Torno, fears he will lose his only witness, but Fred stands up to the gang, despite wife Ann's hysteria. Cowboy gives the Morrows until midnight to change their minds, while gang members Ruby, Muggles and Apple and he throw a rock through the family's window and slash their car's tires.

Cowboy leads the cops on a car chase, but is caught. In court, though, Fred changes his testimony after learning Ann has been attacked by Ruby, and their child is held at gunpoint by Muggles. He later provokes Apple, who is black, into siding against Cowboy, who reveals his racist attitudes toward his accomplice. Torno takes the entire gang into custody, with Apple agreeing to testify.

Cast
 Jeffrey Hunter as Fred Morrow
 Pat Crowley as Ann Morrow
 Dennis Hopper as Cowboy Tomkins
 Joby Baker as Muggles
 Johnny Nash as Apple
 Susan Harrison as Ruby
 Frank Silvera as Det. Torno
 Terry Burnham as Gloria Morrow

Reception
According to MGM records, the film earned $360,000 in the US and Canada and $450,000 in other countries, resulting in a loss of $496,000. Reviews generally praised the film, although The Hollywood Reporter and Variety criticized its element of racism.

Writing in The New York Times, reviewer Howard Thompson praised the film, saying "If 'Key Witness' could be better, we don't know how." He also noted, "...this little picture is fast, tough, tight, sickeningly real to watch and wonderfully well put together."

References

External links
 
 
 
 

1960 films
American black-and-white films
1960s English-language films
Metro-Goldwyn-Mayer films
1960 crime films
Films directed by Phil Karlson
American neo-noir films
American crime films
1960s American films